Australian Crawl was an Australian surf / pop rock band. The band released four studio albums, three live albums, six compilations, seventeen singles, one extended play, and three video albums. These include releases credited to Australian Crawl, Australian Crawl and James Reyne (but not his solo material), and 'Members of Australian Crawl'.

Formation and line-up
The band was founded by James Reyne (lead vocals/piano), his younger brother David Reyne (drums), Brad Robinson (rhythm guitar), Paul Williams (bass guitar) and Simon Binks (lead guitar) in 1978. David Reyne left in 1979 and was replaced by Bill McDonough (drums, percussion), and in October 1980 the band was joined by his younger brother Guy McDonough (vocals, rhythm guitar). In 1979, Australian Crawl recorded their first single, "Beautiful People", produced by Little River Band's guitarist David Briggs. Briggs helped them gain a recording contract with EMI Records; he also produced their debut album The Boys Light Up in 1980, which peaked at number four on the Australian Kent Music Report album charts and remained on the charts for 101 consecutive weeks from 1981 to 1982.

The band's second album, Sirocco, was released in 1981 and achieved number one on the albums charts. On the 1981 Australian End of Year Album Charts, Sirocco is number two, behind Double Fantasy by John Lennon and ahead of AC/DC's Back in Black, making it the best-charting album by an Australian act for the year. Their third album, Sons of Beaches, was released in 1982; it also reached number one. Bill McDonough left before they recorded their extended play, Semantics, in 1983, which achieved number one on the Kent Music Report singles chart. Bill McDonough was replaced on drums, temporarily by Graham Bidstrup and permanently by John Watson. Semantics contained the track "Reckless (Don't Be So)", which is described as a number one-single in Music Australia's profile on James Reyne. The live album Phalanx was a stop-gap measure between studio albums; nevertheless, it reached number four on the albums charts during December 1983. In early 1984, the band signed with Geffen Records for international release of their material.

In 1984, the band released the best of their early material as a compilation titled Crawl File, which peaked at number two on the albums charts. Geffen released Semantics, internationally, as a long play album with six newly re-recorded tracks compiled from their first three studio albums. Promotion of the album and the subsequent tour was stalled when Guy McDonough died in June of viral pneumonia. Before Guy's death, he had recorded demos with his brother Bill McDonough, and ex-members of their earlier band, The Flatheads. Bill McDonough assembled the tapes and produced Guy McDonough's posthumous album My Place on Wheatley Records in April 1985. Tracks from these sessions were re-mastered and released on Lost & Found in 1996, credited under the 'Members of Australian Crawl' name. Meanwhile, remaining Australian Crawl members had recorded their fourth studio album, Between a Rock and a Hard Place, which was released in 1985 and achieved number 11 on the albums charts. This was followed by the announcement that they would disband after another tour. The live album, The Final Wave recorded their performance on 27 January 1986; it was released in October and peaked at number 16 on the albums charts.

Australian Crawl were inducted into the Australian Recording Industry Association (ARIA) Hall of Fame on 30 September 1996. Two weeks later, on 13 October 1996, Robinson died of lymphoma. After Lost & Found, another compilation was released, More Wharf: Their Greatest Hits in 1998. This was followed by the compilation Reckless: 1979–1995, released in 2000 and credited to Australian Crawl and James Reyne.  This was followed by the compilation Australian Crawl and James Reyne: The Definitive Collection, released in 2002.

Albums

Studio albums

Live albums

Compilation albums

Extended plays

Singles

Video albums

Other appearances

References

General
 
 
 
Specific

Notes

External links

James Reyne 

Australian Crawl at Australian Rock Database

Discography
Discographies of Australian artists
Rock music group discographies